In telecommunications, an overlay plan is a telephone numbering plan that assigns multiple area codes to a geographic numbering plan area (NPA). Overlaying numbering plan area codes is practiced in territories of the North American Numbering Plan (NANP) to prevent exhaustion of telephone numbers and central office codes in growth areas.

History
From the inception of the North American Numbering Plan in 1947 until 1992, the only method of introducing new area codes was the area code split. It divided an existing numbering plan area (NPA) into multiple regions, one of which retained the existing area code. The other parts were assigned a new NPA code each. The retaining area was usually the historically more established or developed place, and required no numbering changes. It gained numbering capacity by acquiring the central office prefixes of all other areas. The existing central office codes in the separated areas are maintained in the new numbering plan area, so that the only change for existing subscribers is the change of area code. Thus, only area code references, where present for long-distance calling, required updating in directories, letterheads and business cards.

With the proliferation of electronic central office switching during the 1980s, it became possible to implement another method for expanding numbering plan resources, the area code overlay. In an overlay numbering plan, an additional area code is assigned to an existing numbering plan area, thereby avoiding the need for existing customers to change telephone numbers. The first use of that solution was in New York City in 1992, when area code 917 was overlaid to two numbering plan areas, Manhattan's area code 212, and the outer boroughs' area code 718.

Methodology
Most implementations of the overlay method have required ten-digit dialing, by including the area code, for all subscribers for all calling destinations, local or long-distance.

Exceptions
Near numbering plan area boundaries, special situations arose at times when established communities extended on both sides of the boundary. To preserve local community integrity, identity, and convenience, a party could dial an office prefix for a local call with only seven-digits, but the destination was technically located in the adjacent number plan area. If a subscriber called a distant office prefix with the same area code, the call would require the dialing prefix 1 before the seven- or ten-digit number.

A similar practice was implemented on a large scale in the metropolitan area of Washington, DC, and its suburbs in Maryland and Virginia. Most of the Washington region's inner ring is a single local calling area, even though it is split between three area codes–the District's area code 202, Maryland's area code 301 and Northern Virginia's area code 703. For most of the second half of the 20th century, it was possible to dial any number in the metro area with just seven digits. The entire area implemented a system of central office code protection in which no central office code was duplicated in the entire area. Each existing central office code was properly routed with each area code in the region so that each telephone number in the region could be dialed with any of the regional area codes, giving the appearance of an overlay plan. One side effect of this scheme was that if a number was in use in any portion of the Washington area, the corresponding number in Maryland or Virginia could only be used in an area considered a safe distance from the metro area, such as western Virginia or the Eastern Shore of Maryland. This system was ended in 1991 due to an impending number shortage on both sides of the Potomac River.

A similar method was employed in Canada's capital, Ottawa. It shared the same calling area as Hull, its twin city in Quebec, even though Ottawa was in area code 613 and Hull was in area code 819. Until 2006, it was possible to place a call between Ottawa and Hull with only seven digits. That continued even after Hull was merged into the larger city of Gatineau in 2002. That was implemented in a way that the same number could not be duplicated anywhere in eastern Ontario or western Quebec, even in areas a safe distance from the Ottawa area.  However, Canada's inefficient number allocation system and the proliferation of cellphones brought 819 to the brink of exhaustion by the turn of the century. The only available numbers in 819 could have theoretically been used in the former Hull, but they could not be issued without ending seven-digit dialing between Ottawa and Hull. As was the case in Washington, the only way to free up numbers was to end seven-digit dialing in the area, which was done in 2006. The sole legacy of the old system is a "dual dialability" system for federal government numbers on both sides of the provincial border; all federal government offices on the Quebec side duplicated several exchanges worth of their counterparts on the Ontario side.

Rapid growth
Urban sprawl accelerated the rate of expansion of metropolitan areas, and multiple split plans have caused the geographical area of a given area code in those regions to shrink, except in countries that assign shorter area codes and longer local numbers in areas with high population densities. The rapid growth in popularity of electronic devices (pagers and then mobile phones), in addition to regular landline growth, increased demand for new phone numbers even more. Although landline growth has sharply dropped and even decreased, largely by the elimination of residential landlines in favor of personal mobile phones, it has been replaced by the even worse problem of data-only devices (hotspots, modems, netbooks, and especially popular tablets), which still require a telephone number for use on cellular networks even if they are unable to make or receive regular calls.

The rise in popularity of mobile devices has added to the pressure against split plans, as an area-code change affecting the exchange in which a cellphone is based not only forces customers to reprogram their phones but also requires the wireless carrier to reassign the number of every device based in those areas. While phones with a SIM card have their own mobile device number updated automatically, there is still the inconvenience of users having to update their contact lists for local family members or others who have had their numbers changed too.

Compromise
Most overlay plans introduced the inconvenience of mandatory ten-digit dialing in which the area code must always be included even for local calls. Ten-digit dialing is not a technically necessary requirement, and 917 was initially deployed without it, but a US Federal Communications Commission (FCC) mandate instituted it at the demand of major telephone companies, to whom an overlay is considered a disadvantage to competitors. In Canada, ten-digit dialing is also a requirement of the Canadian Radio-television and Telecommunications Commission in overlay area codes.

Popularity
Overlays were initially met with resistance, as they result in multiple area codes in the same geographic area, which requires ten-digit dialing. In many cases, such as 847 in Chicago's northwestern suburbs and 212 in New York City, an overlay was an additional disruption to a community that had already been subject to one or multiple code splits, encountering pushback from state regulators or consumer groups. However, overlay plans were eventually used much more widely in some areas than others. For example, much of Ohio has large overlay complexes, as has northern Georgia and the North Carolina Piedmont. Connecticut, Illinois, Oregon, New Jersey, Massachusetts, Maryland, Pennsylvania, Texas, Virginia and, more recently, California have also implemented many overlays.  No area code splits have been performed since 2007, when area code 575 split off 505 in New Mexico, and no splits are proposed.

Telecommunications companies have increasingly favored overlays even in sparsely-populated rural areas in which ten-digit local numbers are unnecessary, as split plans force cellular providers to reprogram millions of client handsets. Customers also incur costs to publish new letterheads and to reprogram stored address book data on individual devices. Overlays have become more expedient as the proliferation of cell phones has accelerated area codes exhaustion. In most relief planning projects, overlays have become the sole option considered in the planning stage.

This is especially practiced for area codes that have been pushed back to the brink of exhaustion after being recently split, as carriers want to minimize additional customer inconveniences. For example, Maryland had been served solely by area code 301 from the implementation of the area code system until 1990, when everything from Baltimore eastward was split off as area code 410. Within only five years, 410 was already on the brink of exhaustion due to Baltimore's rapid growth and the proliferation of cell phones, pagers, fax machines and dial-up Internet lines. However, the area's dominant telephone provider, Bell Atlantic (now part of Verizon) realized that a split would have forced residents of either Baltimore or the Eastern Shore to change their numbers for the second time in the 1990s. Accordingly, area code 443 was created as an overlay for all of the eastern portion of Maryland in 1996.

Overlay plans also favor incumbent wireline carriers over new entrants, as the established firm already has large allocations of numbers in the more desirable existing code, and subscribers of new or growing competing carriers are relegated to unfamiliar, new codes.

The first example of an area code overlaid on an entire U.S. jurisdiction was Puerto Rico, with area code 939 added to the numbering plan area of area code 787, in 2001. Puerto Rico had just been split from area code 809, the area code for much of the Caribbean, in 1996. A split was deemed unfeasible due to the island's extremely dense population and the lack of a suitable boundary for a split. Additionally, a split would have forced half of Puerto Ricans to change telephone numbers for the second time in a decade.

The first instance of a statewide overlay was West Virginia's area code 304, in 2009. West Virginia had been served by 304 since the inception of the North American Numbering Plan, but it was obvious by 2007 that the state needed a new area code. At first, state officials voted to split off northern West Virginia with area code 681 and to leave southern West Virginia in 304. However, lobbying by the telecommunications industry led the state to reverse the decision and turn 681 into an overlay. Idaho followed that precedent in 2017 by overlaying area code 208 with 986.

Overlays gained popularity among Canadian telephone companies in the early 2000s, primarily as a workaround for the country's inefficient number allocation system. Every competing carrier is issued blocks of 10,000 numbers (corresponding to a single three-digit prefix) in each rate center in which it offers new service and each local interconnection region in which it ports existing numbers. While most rate centers in Canada do not need nearly that many numbers to service customers adequately, a number cannot be reassigned elsewhere once it is assigned to a carrier and rate center. This resulted in a large amount of unallocated numbers. The problem was exacerbated by the proliferation of cellphones, fax machines, pagers, and dial-up Internet connections, particularly in larger markets. Partly due to this, the area codes corresponding to four of the five largest Canadian markets (416 in Toronto, 514 in Montreal, 604 in Vancouver, and 403 in Calgary) were split in the 1990s.

The number allocation problem manifested itself at the turn of the century in Metro Toronto and the Golden Horseshoe, the center of Canada's largest local calling area. This area had been served by 416 since the institution of the area code system. Despite the Golden Horseshoe's explosive growth in the second half of the 20th century, numbers in the region were used up fairly quickly. As a result, the number allocation problem was not as severe in 416 as it was in the rest of Canada. Nevertheless, it was severe enough to force Toronto's suburban ring into area code 905 in 1993. While the Golden Horseshoe would have likely needed another area code due to its continued growth, it is very likely that the immediate need for relief would have been staved off had it been possible to reallocate numbers from the smaller rate centers in the region to Metro Toronto. Within two years of the 905 split, 416 was back on the verge of exhaustion. American cities such as New York City, Chicago, and Los Angeles had been split between two area codes, but that solution was quickly ruled out for Metro Toronto because of the area's extremely dense population and the lack of a suitable boundary for a split. It was ultimately decided to overlay 416 with area code 647 in 2001, two years after Metro Toronto was merged into the "megacity" of Toronto.

The successful implementation of 647 triggered the rapid adoption of overlays across Canada. By 2013, seven-digit dialing had been eliminated in every Canadian numbering plan area except in the country's three Arctic territories (area code 867), a large but sparsely-populated area in northwestern Ontario (area code 807), New Brunswick (area code 506), and Newfoundland and Labrador (area code 709). Overlays are now the preferred method of expansion in Canada, and no numbering plan areas have been split in the country since 1999.

British Columbia and the Prairie Provinces have followed Puerto Rico and West Virginia's lead with province-wide overlays. In those cases, a factor behind the decision was the desire to spare rural areas the expense and burden of changing their numbers.

Â==Types==
The North American Numbering Plan Administrator recognizes several types of overlays:

In a distributed overlay, or all-services overlay, an entire existing numbering plan area (NPA) gains another area code serving the entire area. Most overlays are of this kind.

In a single concentrated overlay, only the high-growth portion of an existing area gains a second area code. This was previously implemented in several numbering plan areas, but all of them have since covered entire NPAs.

In a multiple concentrated overlay, the entire existing numbering plan area gains multiple additional area codes, each of which serves a different subsection of the original. This has not been implemented yet.

In a multiple-area distributed overlay, two or more numbering plan areas gain a single new area code covering the entire area, either concurrently or in phases. Examples include 872 in Chicago, Illinois (over 312 and 773) as well as 587 and 825 in Alberta (over 403 and 780). In an phased example, area code 564 was implemented initially only on area code 360 in 2017, but will expand to three other codes when needed, in western Washington.

A boundary-extension overlay is a plan in which one or more neighboring area codes (an overlay code or a single primary area code) is expanded to serve the area as well. Examples include 321 over 407 in central Florida and 778 over 250 in British Columbia. In 1999, 281 was the first to do so, merging with 713 in Houston; later that year, 972 merged with 214, followed by 323 merging with 213 in Los Angeles in 2017 and 858, in San Diego, with 619 a year later. In 2023, the first multiple boundary-extension overlay will take place in the Phoenix metropolitan area with the folding of area codes 602, 480 and 623 into a single overlay area.

Service-specific overlays are not practiced in the NANP. Only one case, the first overlay area code in the NANPA, 917, was an example of this. It was established originally as an area code specifically for cellphones and pagers in New York City, but soon afterward, the FCC specified that area codes must not be service-specific, but it grandfathered this use for 917. Later, 917 became available for landline assignments in New York City on a limited basis.

Number pool management
The persistent unpopularity of new area code creation by split or overlay plans has led to a change in the rules of number block allocation to conserve the pool of available telephone numbers. The change, which allowed for the assignment of smaller number blocks, is commonly known as number pooling and has noticeably slowed the need for area code growth. For example, the western half of Washington, including Seattle, narrowly avoided the need for an overlay in 2001. Area code 564, originally planned for introduction in October 2001, was delayed indefinitely in August 2001 after state regulators determined that the use of number pooling had allowed existing numbers in western Washington to be used more efficiently. The 564 overlay plan did not have to go into action until 2017.

Number pooling is not practiced in Canada. As was previously mentioned, every competing carrier is issued blocks of 10,000 numbers for every rate center in which it offers service, regardless of its actual subscriber count. Individual rate centers exist even in the smallest hamlets, and even tiny unincorporated villages receive multiple blocks of 10,000 numbers. Larger cities, particularly "megacities" that were created by amalgamations in the 1990s and early 2000s, have multiple rate centers, which were not combined for years, if at all. For example, Mississauga, Canada's sixth-largest city, is split between five rate centers even though it has been a single municipality since 1974. Hamilton, the nation's tenth-largest city, is split between nine rate centers. Surrey, the nation's twelfth-largest city, is split between three rate centers and part of a fourth, while Ottawa is split between 11. Overlays became the preferred relief solution in Canada, partly because it is not possible to reassign a number from a smaller rate center to a larger one, even if the smaller rate center has enough numbers to serve it. By 2013, as mentioned above, seven-digit dialling had been eliminated in all eight of Canada's original numbering plan areas.

See also
List of area code overlays
Interexchange carrier
Telephone exchange
Exhaust date

Notes

References

External links

FCC FAQ - Carrier Identification Codes (CICs) and Seven-Digit Carrier Access Code (CAC) Dialing

North American Numbering Plan